Raindrop is a messaging application building on Apache's CouchDB which is used through a web interface. Raindrop works by collecting messages (currently emails and tweets, but more will be available through addons) and storing them as JSON optionally with attachments in CouchDB. They are then served to users with CouchDB's webserver so users can view them in their web browsers. By December 2009 there was a prototype for testers but no official stable release.

History
Raindrop was introduced by the Mozilla Foundation on Thursday, October 22, 2009. It is an exploration in messaging innovation being led by the team responsible for Thunderbird, to explore new ways to use Open Web technologies to create useful, compelling messaging experiences.  As of February 2014, the Mozilla Raindrop project is considered inactive.

References

External links
Mozilla Labs » Raindrop

JavaScript
Mozilla
Free database management systems